Mimorista villicalis is a moth in the family Crambidae. It was described by Heinrich Benno Möschler in 1886. It is found in Jamaica.

References

Moths described in 1886
Spilomelinae